C12, C.XII or C-12 may be:
LNER Class C12, a class of British 4-4-2T locomotives 
C12 Workmen's Compensation (Agriculture) Convention, 1921
C-12 Huron, a logistics support aircraft of the U.S. Military (military versions of the Beechcraft Super King Air)
C-12 Vega, an early transport of the United States Army Air Corps
Albatros C.XII, a World War I German military reconnaissance aircraft
Autovia C-12, a highway in Catalonia, Spain
Cierva C.12, a 1927 British experimental autogyro 
 , a British C-class submarine of the Royal Navy
JNR Class C12, a class of Japanese steam locomotive
Sauber C12, a 1993 racing car
Spyker C12 Zagato, a 2007 Dutch car 
 , a light cruiser of the United States Navy
C-12: Final Resistance, a video game for PlayStation
Caldwell 12 (NGC 6945, the Fireworks Galaxy), an intermediate spiral galaxy in the constellations Cepheus and Cygnus
 The 12th century
Carbon-12, the most abundant stable isotope of carbon
Malignant neoplasm of piriform sinus ICD-10 code
Bill C-12 in Canadian law